The 2016 Women's U19 Volleyball European Championship was played in Slovakia and Hungary from 27 August to 4 September 2016.

Participating teams
Host Countries

Qualified through 2016 Women's U19 Volleyball European Championship Qualification

Pools composition

Venues

Preliminary round
All times are Central European Summer Time (UTC+02:00)

Pool I

|}

|}

Pool II

|}

|}

Final round
All times are Central European Summer Time (UTC+02:00)

5th–8th place

5th–8th semifinals

|}

7th place match

|}

5th place match

|}

Final

Semifinals

|}

3rd place match

|}

Final

|}

Final standing

Awards

Most Valuable Player
  Anna Kotikova 
Best Setter
  Inna Balyko 
Best Outside Spikers
  Karolina Fricova 
  Katarina Lazović 

Best Middle Blockers
  Angelina Lazarenko 
  Jovana Kocić 
Best Opposite Spiker
  Anna Kotikova 
Best Libero
  Giorgia Zannoni

See also
2016 Men's U20 Volleyball European Championship

External links
 Official website

2016
European Championship U19
International volleyball competitions hosted by Slovakia
International volleyball competitions hosted by Hungary
2016 in Slovak women's sport
2016 in Hungarian women's sport
2016 in youth sport
August 2016 sports events in Europe
September 2016 sports events in Europe